Jakub Šebesta (born 16 November 1948) is a Czech politician. He was the Minister of Agriculture and former Minister of Environment in the caretaker government of Jan Fischer.

References

External links 
 Jakub Šebesta poprvé předsedal radě pro zemědělství a rybářství (Government of the Czech Republic) 

1948 births
Living people
People from Břeclav District
Environment ministers of the Czech Republic
Czech Social Democratic Party Government ministers
Agriculture ministers of the Czech Republic